Koh Sdach island (Khmer: កោះស្តេច,  King Island) is located in the Gulf of Thailand, around  off the coast of Botum Sakor national park, in the Kiri Sakor district in Koh Kong province, Cambodia. It belongs to a small archipelago of 12 islands, all in relative proximity to each other and to the main land. A fishing community inhabits the island, with people of Khmer, Chinese, Thai and Vietnamese descent. The village stretches along the east side of the island; to the west there is a small Khmer run bungalow guesthouse; at the southern end of the island lies a luxurious holiday resort. Koh Sdach has two beaches, one to the south and one westerly facing.

Geography 

Koh Sdach is the capital island of the Koh Sdach archipelago. Natural jungle has been replaced by coconut trees and forest crops for commercial purposes. Settlements are mainly in the North, while the southern third is almost non-populated.

Community 
As in most of Cambodia, the government is largely nonfunctional even to the extent that the de facto currency is the US DOLLAR. A large portion of the economy is of a subsistence nature with a large reliance on fishing. Roughly 70% of the working population are fishermen with most of the rest being farmers or small-time businessmen. Most of the fish that is caught is sold to Thailand.

Legend 

According to legend, there once was a king who commanded an army on the island. Because there was no fresh water, the king searched everywhere to find some. At last he found a rock near the sea. Thinking the rock might contain water; the king drew his sword and split open the rock, releasing an endless flow of water that local people still use today.

See also 
 Koh Rong
 Koh Rong Sanloem
 List of islands of Cambodia
 List of Cambodian inland islands
 Koh Kong

External links
Cambodia's Islands

References

Islands of Cambodia
Geography of Koh Kong province
Islands of the Gulf of Thailand